The University of Lorraine, often abbreviated in UL, is a grand établissement created on 1 January 2012, by the merger of Henri Poincaré University, Nancy 2 University, Paul Verlaine University – Metz and the National Polytechnic Institute of Lorraine (INPL). It aimed to unify the main colleges of the Lorraine region. The merger process started in 2009 with the creation of a "Pôle de Recherche et d'Enseignement Supérieur".

The university has 51 campus sites, over the Lorraine region, the main ones are around Nancy and Metz. The other sites are in the towns of Epinal, Saint-Dié-des-Vosges, Bar-Le-Duc, Lunéville, Thionville-Yutz, Longwy, Forbach, Saint-Avold, Sarreguemines.

The University of Lorraine has over 62,000 students (10,000 international students) and 7,000 staff.

History
The original University of Lorraine was founded in 1572 in the nearby city of Pont-à-Mousson by Charles III, duke of Lorraine, and Charles, Cardinal of Lorraine, and was then run by the Jesuits. The University was transferred to Nancy in 1768. The University of Nancy was closed by the revolutionaries in 1793, and reopened in 1864.

University of Lorraine is the merger of:
Nancy-Université, itself a merger of:
Henri Poincaré University (or Nancy 1): natural sciences, wrapping several faculties and engineering schools
Nancy 2 University: social sciences
Institut national polytechnique de Lorraine (INPL): engineering schools
 Paul Verlaine University – Metz

Teaching

Teaching includes 43 teaching units (faculties, schools, departments), organized into 9 collegia:
 Arts, Literature, and Languages
 Engineering Schools
 Health
 Humanities and Social Sciences
 Interface
 Law, Economy, and Management
 Lorraine Management Innovation
 Sciences and Technologies
 Technology

Engineering schools

 École européenne d'ingénieurs en génie des matériaux (EEIGM) : material engineering
 École nationale d'ingénieurs de Metz (ENIM)
 École Nationale Supérieure des Industries Alimentaires (ENSAIA): agricultural engineering
 École Nationale Supérieure d'Electricité et de Mécanique (ENSEM): electrical and mechanical engineering
 École Nationale Supérieure de Géologie (ENSG): geology
 École Nationale Supérieure des Industries Chimiques (ENSIC): chemistry
 École Nationale Supérieure des Technologies et Industries du Bois (ENSTIB): wood industry and technology engineering
 École nationale supérieure en génie des systèmes et de l'innovation (ENSGSI)
 Mines Nancy
 Polytech Nancy
 Telecom Nancy

Research 
The university has 60 research units, linked with the most important French research organizations: CNRS, INSERM, INRAE and INRIA. They are organized into 10 research areas.

Among these:

  (LORIA): computer sciences
 : material sciences

Doctoral studies are organized into 8 doctoral schools, where 400 thesis are defended annually. The 1,800 phd students come from 90 different nationalities.

Libraries 
The university has a network of 25 libraries, managed by the Documentation department.

Culture and museums 
University of Lorraine operates several arts and scientific places and museums, and a botanic garden: Le préau, national theater Espace Bernard-Marie Koltès, Maison pour la Science en Lorraine, Musée archéologique, Aquarium Museum, Musée de l’Histoire du Fer, Jardin Botanique Jean-Marie-Pelt. The last three are co-operated with the Metropole of Grand Nancy.

Rankings

University of Lorraine undergraduate law program is ranked 5th of France by Eduniversal, with 3 stars (2016/17).

According to Academic Ranking of World Universities (ARWU) 2021, University of Lorraine is ranked first European University in the subject  Mining & Mineral Engineering.

Notable people
 François Gény (1861–1959), French professor and jurist who introduced notion of "free scientific research" in positive law.
 Victor Grignard (1871-1935) was a researcher and a teacher at the university when he won the Nobel Prize in Chemistry in 1912.
 Laurent Schwartz (1915-2002) was a researcher and teacher at the university when he received the Fields Medal in 1950.
 Jean-Pierre Serre (1926-alive) was a "maître de conférences" (MCF) at the university when he received the Fields Medal in 1954.
 Alexander Grothendieck (1928-2014), alumni that later became the leading figure in the creation of modern algebraic geometry.

References

External links 
 Website: Université de Lorraine
 Website: Welcome Université de Lorraine
 Website: Open Science at the University of Lorraine
 Video: Presentation of the University of Lorraine (2015)
 Video: Université de Lorraine Key Figures (2020)
 Video: We are Université de Lorraine (2021)

 
Universities and colleges in Metz
Universities and colleges in Nancy, France
Lorraine
Universities and colleges formed by merger in France